The Big Freeze is a 1993 featurette-length film written and directed by Eric Sykes. The action centres on mishaps involving a father and son plumbing team attending to business in sub-zero temperatures at a retirement home in Finland. Like other Sykes directorial vehicles, the piece is a silent comedy with a star cast - here including Bob Hoskins, John Mills, Donald Pleasence and Spike Milligan.

Synopsis
A silent comedy. Two accident-prone plumbers go to fix the plumbing at a home for retired gentle-folk on the coldest day of the year in Finland. Everything that can go wrong for these plumbers goes wrong.

Cast
 Bob Hoskins as Sidney
 Eric Sykes as Mr. Blick
 Eila Roine as Matron
 Donald Pleasence as Soup slurper
 Raija Laakso as Louise
 Sonja Lumme as Pretty Nurse
 John Mills as Dapper Man
 Spike Milligan as Der Schauspieler
 Sylvi Salonen as The Flapper
 Hellin Auvinen-Salmi as Old Lady
 Helinä Viitanen as Zimmer Lady
 Erkki Thil as Film Director
 Gabriel Laszlo as Fencer with Wig
 Hannes Anttila as Fencer
 Gunnar Strommer as Man in Bath
 Lasse Tiilkainen as Magician
 Ransu Alhoniemi as Juggler
 Mary Hayley Bell as Nursing Home Resident (uncredited)

Production
The film was shot in Hervanta and Teisko, both districts in Tampere, Finland.

References

External links
 
 
 The Big Freeze at letterboxd

1993 films
British comedy films
British silent feature films
1993 comedy films
British independent films
Films directed by Eric Sykes
Films without speech
Films set in Finland
Films shot in Finland
Silent films in color
1990s British films
Silent comedy films